Ludo Peeters (born 9 August 1953) is a former Belgian professional road bicycle racer. He was professional from 1974 to 1990. He rode ten editions of the Tour de France and won 3 stages, one in 1980, one in 1982 and one in 1986. He also wore the yellow jersey as leader of the general classification for one day in 1982 after his stage win and also in 1984.

Major results

1974
 1st Stage 10 Tour de Pologne
1975
 2nd Grand Prix de Fourmies
 3rd Nationale Sluitingsprijs
1976
 1st Omloop van de Vlaamse Scheldeboorden
 2nd Overall Tour of the Netherlands
1977
 1st Paris–Brussels
 1st  Overall Omloop Mandel-Leie-Schelde
1st Stage 1
 1st Stage 4 Tour of the Netherlands
 1st Prologue Grand Prix du Midi Libre
 1st Stage 1 Tour de l'Aude
 2nd Scheldeprijs
 3rd Omloop Het Volk
1978
 1st Schaal Sels
 1st  Overall Tour de Luxembourg
 3rd Brabantse Pijl
1979
 1st Paris–Brussels
 1st Druivenkoers Overijse
 1st Omloop Mandel-Leie-Schelde
1980
 1st Scheldeprijs
 1st Omloop van het Leiedal
 1st Stage 9 Tour de Suisse
 1st Stage 4b Tour of Belgium
 2nd Giro della Romagna
 2nd Grote Prijs Stad Zottegem
 2nd Trofeo Baracchi
 2nd Kuurne–Brussels–Kuurne
 8th Overall Tour de France
1st Stage 14
1st combination classification
 9th Paris–Roubaix
1981
 1st Omloop van het Leiedal
 1st Stage 2 Tour de Romandie
 1st Stage 7b Volta a Catalunya
 3rd Grand Prix du Midi Libre
1982
 1st Rund um den Henninger Turm
 Tour de France
1st stage 1
Held  for one stage
 1st Stages 3 & 6 Volta a Catalunya
 8th Paris–Roubaix
1983
 1st Rund um den Henninger Turm
 1st Paris–Tours
 1st Grote Prijs Raymond Impanis
 1st Dwars door West-Vlaanderen
 1st Stages 2 & 4 Volta a Catalunya
 1st Stage 4 Setmana Catalana de Ciclisme
 1st Stage 2 Étoile de Bessèges
 3rd Giro del Lazio
1984
 1st Scheldeprijs
 Tour de France
Held  for one stage
1985
 1st  Overall Tour of Belgium
1st Stage 1
 1st Zürich-Metzgete
 1st Paris–Tours
 1st Stage 2 Tour de l'Aude
1986
 1st Stage 7 Tour de France
1987
 1st Kuurne–Brussels–Kuurne
1989
 1st Omloop van het Leiedal

External links 

Official Tour de France results for Ludo Peeters

1953 births
Living people
Belgian male cyclists
Belgian Tour de France stage winners
Tour de Suisse stage winners
People from Hoogstraten
Cyclists from Antwerp Province